Socx (from Flemish; Soks in modern Dutch spelling) is a commune in the Nord department in northern France. The population in 2019 was 923.

Geography

Heraldry

Governance and Politics
The current mayor is Alexandre Rommelaere, elected in 2020. Previous mayors were Christian Ley (term of office: 2008–2020) and Charles Vandaele (2001–2008).

Twin towns
Socx was twinned with Caton, Lancashire, United Kingdom on 12 April 2008.

See also
Communes of the Nord department

References

External links

 

Communes of Nord (French department)
French Flanders